Egypt is scheduled to compete at the 2017 World Aquatics Championships in Budapest, Hungary from 14 July to 30 July.

Medalists

Diving

Egypt has entered 6 divers (three male and three female).

Men

Women

Mixed

Open water swimming

Egypt has entered seven open water swimmers

Swimming

Egyptian swimmers have achieved qualifying standards in the following events (up to a maximum of 2 swimmers in each event at the A-standard entry time, and 1 at the B-standard):

Men

Women

Synchronized swimming

Egypt's synchronized swimming team consisted of 11 athletes (11 female).

Women

 Legend: (R) = Reserve Athlete

References

Nations at the 2017 World Aquatics Championships
2017
World Aquatics Championships